I Love Rock 'n Roll is the second studio album by Joan Jett and the first with her backing band the Blackhearts. The album was recorded during the summer of 1981 and was released on November 18 of that year. Soon after the first recording sessions at Soundworks Studios, original Blackheart guitarist Eric Ambel was replaced by Ricky Byrd. It is Jett's most commercially successful album to date with over a million copies sold, largely due to the success of the title track, which was released as a single soon after the album was released.

Background and recording
Joan Jett saw "I Love Rock 'n' Roll" performed on TV by Arrows in 1976 and was taken away by the song. It was a staple of her set list for years before the album was recorded.

Along with the Arrows song, plenty of other covers populated the album: "Nag" (originally by the Halos),"Bits and Pieces" (the Dave Clark Five), "You're Too Possessive" (the Runaways), and  "Crimson and Clover" (Tommy James & the Shondells). Of the last song, Jett later commented that "People worried that I didn't change the words in 'Crimson and Clover' to 'him' from 'her'. It was only because that wouldn't have rhymed."

Other covers appeared in limited editions: "Louie Louie" (Richard Berry, later performed by the Kingsmen) and "Summertime Blues" (Eddie Cochran) were included as bonus tracks on the CD release, and the traditional Christmas carol "Little Drummer Boy" was a seasonal addition to the LP.

"I Love Rock 'n Roll" was made at a vigorous pace. "During the weekdays we'd be in the studio and during the weekends we'd travel around the New York area, the Northeast, doing gigs," Jett recalled. "So we were doing both without really stopping. Which was good I thought, it really kept us together, it kept us sharp."

Release

Early copies of the album released during December 1981 concluded with the track "Little Drummer Boy". However, after the holiday season, the track was replaced by the newly recorded "Oh Woe Is Me" on most pressings. The LP saw a vinyl reissue in 2009 containing both "Little Drummer Boy", "Oh Woe Is Me", and the rehearsal version of "You Don't Know What You've Got" that was the original B-side to Boardwalk Records U.S. and Canadian issues of the "I Love Rock 'n' Roll" single. It was possible to acquire "Oh Woe Is Me" without purchasing a replacement album, as it was also released as the B-side of the "Crimson and Clover" single.

"Summertime Blues" was originally left off the vinyl LP, and Boardwalk passed on releasing it as an official commercial single. Instead, Boardwalk placed the song as the B-side of "Do You Wanna Touch Me (Oh Yeah)", in a promo-only 12-inch release (Boardwalk NB-019-S-5) sent to US rock radio stations. Many DJs and programmers preferred the B-side however, and "Summertime Blues" became a Most Added listing. (The A-side nonetheless peaked at No. 20 on the Billboard Hot 100.) The song was eventually released as a one-sided single in Canada and as a 12-inch single in Australia, accompanied by "Do You Wanna Touch Me (Oh Yeah)".

In conjunction with Joan Jett & the Blackhearts being inducted into the Rock and Roll Hall of Fame on April 18, 2015, exactly 33 ⅓ years after I Love Rock 'n' Roll was originally released on November 18, 1981, a 2CD/2LP titled I Love Rock 'n' Roll 33 ⅓ Anniversary Edition was released. This commemorative edition paired the original album with a second disc of previously unreleased live recordings made in New York from 1981.

Cover art 
The portrait image used for the cover was taken by British photographer Mick Rock. It is widely considered one of the most iconic images in rock music history. Rock has said his vision for the portrait was clear: "I saw her as a female Elvis".

The styling played a part in Jett's overall appeal; Creem observed and asked rhetorically, "who ever said that dark bangs and well-applied mascara had nothing to do with rock 'n' roll?" Sounds described her look as the classic "tomboy rock girl", and quoted her regarding the record label's initial expectations:
"They wanted me to lie on a couch in leopardskin like Pat Benatar or something," she gasps, "You know I couldn't do anything like that!"

Critical reception 

Creems Mitchell Cohen gave I Love Rock 'n Roll a generally positive review, concluding that Jett "covers more ground than you might expect, and does so with contagious enthusiasm". Robert Christgau of The Village Voice qualified his praise of the album, writing, "Covering the Dave Clark Five and 'Little Drummer Boy' on the same side is a great schlock yea-saying move, but a move is all it is—makes me want to hear the originals rather than play the side again"; he also felt that Jett's original compositions lacked "spark".

Reviewing I Love Rock 'n Roll for AllMusic, Stephen Thomas Erlewine said that the Blackhearts' backing gave the album "a more coherent sound" than that of Jett's previous album Bad Reputation, as well as "dimension". While noting a relative lack of "strong songs", on the whole he found that the band's "muscular, gritty" playing makes I Love Rock 'n Roll "just as good as Bad Reputation."

Track listing

Personnel
Joan Jett – lead vocals, rhythm guitar

The Blackhearts
Ricky Byrd – lead guitar, backing vocals
Gary Ryan – bass, backing vocals
Lee Crystal – drums, backing vocals
Additional musicians
Eric Ambel – lead guitar, backing vocals on tracks 5 and 10
Will "Dub" Jones – vocals on track 10
The Coasters – backing vocals on track 15
Kenny Laguna - keyboards, percussion, background vocals
Production team
Kenny Laguna – production
Ritchie Cordell – production
Glen Kolotkin – associate producer; engineering
Gerry Gabinelli – engineer
Stew Romain – mastering
Bob Ludwig – 1992 remastering at Masterdisk, New York

Charts

Weekly charts

Year-end charts

Certifications

References

1981 albums
Albums with cover art by Mick Rock
Blackheart Records albums
Joan Jett albums